The enzyme serine-ethanolaminephosphate phosphodiesterase (EC 3.1.4.13) catalyzes the reaction 

serine phosphoethanolamine + H2O  serine + ethanolamine phosphate

This enzyme belongs to the family of hydrolases, specifically those acting on phosphoric diester bonds.  The systematic name is serine-phosphoethanolamine ethanolaminephosphohydrolase. Other names in common use include serine ethanolamine phosphodiester phosphodiesterase, and SEP diesterase.  This enzyme participates in glycerophospholipid metabolism.

References

 

EC 3.1.4
Enzymes of unknown structure